Economics of Strategy is a textbook by David Besanko, David Dranove, Scott Schaefer, and Mark Shanley. The book offers a solid economic foundation for strategic analysis. The text was initially published in 1996 by John Wiley & Sons and, as of 2017, available in its seventh edition. Economics of Strategy is one of the leading books of its kind and has earned loyalty both as a classroom tool and as a professional reference book. The signature book covers feature famous impressionist paintings.
The Economics of strategy, 5th édition has been translated into French by Thierry Burger-Helmchen, Julien Pénin and Caroline Hussler, under the title "Principes économiques de stratégie", edited by DeBoeck.

Overview
This influential business book provides a detailed and comprehensive text offering a link between economic theory and business applications. The book uses economic theory to discuss and to quantify popular concepts of modern business strategy. The text is technical in its approach but accessible due to its numerous real-world examples. The examples are drawn from around the globe and cover various business practices from the eighteenth century to modern days. 
 Part One centers on the boundaries of the firm; 
 Part Two discusses competition; 
 Part Three focuses on positioning and sustaining advantage; and 
 Part Four covers the interface among the theory of the firm, organization design, and business strategy.

See also
 Business analysis
 Business model
 Competitive advantage
 Management consulting
 Strategy dynamics
 Strategic planning
 Strategic Management Society
 Six Forces Model

References

1996 non-fiction books
Popular science books
American non-fiction books
Business books
Wiley (publisher) books